Pavel Aleksandrovich Averyanov (born 22 December 1984) is a former Russian professional football player.

Club career
He played in the Russian Football National League for FC Fakel Voronezh in 2002 and 2003.

External links
 

1984 births
Footballers from Voronezh
Living people
Russian footballers
Association football midfielders
FC Fakel Voronezh players
FC Arsenal Tula players